Chinley, Buxworth and Brownside is a civil parish in the High Peak district of Derbyshire, England.  The parish contains 29 listed buildings that are recorded in the National Heritage List for England.  Of these, one is listed at Grade II*, the middle of the three grades, and the others are at Grade II, the lowest grade.  The parish contains settlements, including the villages of Chinley and Buxworth, and is otherwise rural.  Most of the listed buildings are farmhouses and farm buildings, houses, cottages and associated structures.  The Peak Forest Canal ends in the parish at Bugsworth Basin, and two listed buildings are associated with it.  The other listed buildings consist of a church and two chapels, and a pair of railway viaducts.


Key

Buildings

References

Citations

Sources

#

 

Lists of listed buildings in Derbyshire